Dikili is a coastal town and a district of İzmir Province in the Aegean Region of Turkey. The district is quite picturesque both along its shoreline and in its inland parts, and is a popular summer resort. The notable township of Çandarlı (ancient Pitane) is located close to Dikili.

History
The ancient and as yet unexplored site of Atarneus is located nearby. The site is called "Atarna" locally.

Dikili is the birthplace of the Greek American left-wing activist and artist Aristodimos Kaldis (1899 – 1979), the Greek archaeologist Efstratios Pelekidis (1880/1882 - 1958), and the Greek poet and playwright Angelos Simiriotis (1873 – 1944).

Geography

Dikili town centre is situated opposite the Greek island of Lesbos. A small islet within Dikili district (called Garip Adası locally, with ancient sources also citing the name Argounissai) made international headlines in April 2007. The islet was offered for sale by its proprietors and The Guardian reported the Greek islanders of Lesbos raising money among themselves to buy the islet.

Important places
There is a crater lake in Merdivenli village, and ancient caverns in Demirtaş and Deliktaş villages, as well as pine forests extending towards the Madra Stream. There are thermal springs, which are in Nebiler, Bademli and Kocaoba villages. There are also beaches in Bademli and Denizköy. The Merkez Mosque is a rare example of a wooden construction dating from 1789. It was built without using any nails in the construction.

See also
Atarneus
Garip Island

References

External links

http://www.dikili.biz.tr/

 http://www.izmir-dikili.bel.tr/

 
Populated coastal places in Turkey
Seaside resorts in Turkey
Aegean Sea port cities and towns in Turkey
Populated places in İzmir Province
Tourist attractions in İzmir Province
Fishing communities in Turkey
Districts of İzmir Province